Realitatea Plus (meaning "The Reality Plus") is an all-news channel launched on 1 November 2019 that took the place of Realitatea TV. Its owners are Romanian politician Cozmin Guşă and businessman Maricel Păcuraru.

History
Realitatea Plus was launched on 1 November 2019 replacing the defunct all-news channel Realitatea TV.

References

External links 
 Official Site

Television stations in Romania
Television channels and stations established in 2001
24-hour television news channels in Romania
Romanian news websites